Gustavo Souto Sampedro (born 19 April 1983) is a Spanish retired footballer who played as a forward.

Club career
Souto started his senior career with CD Choco. In 2012, he signed for Kairat in the Kazakhstan Premier League, where he made nine league appearances and scored two goals. After that, he played for New Zealand club Auckland City, and Spanish clubs Ourense CF, Alondras CF, and Rápido de Bouzas before retiring in 2016.

After retiring, Souto started working as a financial advisor in his home country.

References

External links
 
 
 

1983 births
Living people
Footballers from Vigo
Spanish footballers
Association football forwards
Segunda División B players
Tercera División players
UP Langreo footballers
Racing de Ferrol footballers
CF Atlético Ciudad players
CD Guadalajara (Spain) footballers
SD Eibar footballers
UD Logroñés players
CD Teruel footballers
Rápido de Bouzas players
FC Kairat players
Auckland City FC players
Spanish expatriate footballers
Spanish expatriate sportspeople in Kazakhstan
Spanish expatriate sportspeople in New Zealand
Expatriate footballers in Kazakhstan
Expatriate association footballers in New Zealand